Mahayana canon is the canon of scriptures of Mahayana Buddhism.

Mahayana canon may specifically refer to:
 Mahayana sutras, sutras specific to the Mahayana school
 Chinese Buddhist canon, the total body of Buddhist literature deemed canonical in China, Korea, Japan and Vietnam
 Tripitaka Koreana, the original, intact Chinese canon on woodblocks, as produced in the 13th century Korea 
 Taishō Tripiṭaka, the definitive 20th century edition of the Chinese canon with Japanese commentaries
 Tibetan Buddhist canon, a loosely defined collection of sacred texts and commentaries recognized by various sects of Tibetan Buddhism
 Kangyur, sacred texts recognized by various schools of Tibetan Buddhism
 Tengyur, the commentaries, translated and original, of the schools of Tibetan Buddhism

See also
 Tripiṭaka, the general name of the Buddhist canon
 Early Buddhist texts, the pre-canon texts 
 Pali Canon, the standard scripture collection of the Theravada Buddhist tradition
 Gandhāran Buddhist texts, the oldest preserved collection of Buddhist manuscripts of the canon